Fordlândia (Ford-land) is a district and adjacent area of  in the city of Aveiro, in the Brazilian state of Pará.

It was established by American industrialist Henry Ford in the Amazon Rainforest in 1928 as a prefabricated industrial town intended to be inhabited by 10,000 people to secure a source of cultivated rubber for the automobile manufacturing operations of the Ford Motor Company in the United States. Ford's project failed, and the city was abandoned in 1934.

The town was mostly deserted, with only 90 residents still living in the city until the early 2000s when it saw an increase of population, being home to around 3,000 people .

Background

In the 1920s, the Ford Motor Company sought to elude the British monopoly over the supply of rubber, mainly used for producing tires and other car parts. Henry Ford looked for alternatives and a permanent place to establish a colony to produce rubber. Central America was considered; however, information about the rubber trees in the Amazon was uncovered and this, along with other factors, caused a change of plans.

Negotiations with the Brazilian government started during the visit by then-governor of the State of Pará, to the United States to meet Ford. An agreement was signed and the American industrialist received an area of about 2.5 million acres (10,100 km2) called "Boa Vista". The agreement exempted Ford from taxes on the exportation of goods produced in Brazil in exchange for 9% of the profits, 7% going to the Brazilian government and 2% of profits to local municipalities.

History
Work on the area began in 1926 by the Companhia Ford Industrial do Brasil. It was immediately hindered by poor logistics and diseases that affected the workers who succumbed to yellow fever and malaria. No roads were available in the area thus the area was only accessible by the Tapajós River. The site was developed as a planned community with different areas of the city being designated for the Brazilian workers and the American managers, who lived in the so-called American Village. Typical American houses were built, as were a hospital, school, library, and hotel. The town also had a swimming pool, a playground, and a golf course.

In 1928, the Ford Motor Company sent two merchant ships – Lake Ormoc and Lake Farge – loaded with equipment and furnishings ranging from door knobs to the town's water tower. The town was then founded under the name Fordlândia.

Seeking workers, several offices were opened in the cities of Belém and Manaus, and, with the promise of good wages, people of the nearby states answered.

In lower temperatures the latex is concentrated in the lower areas of the tree, as the temperature rises during the day the latex spreads throughout the tree, making the tapping less effective. Due to this, the typical journey of a rubber tapper began early in the morning, at around 5 am, ending at noon. The plantation was divided into areas and each worker was assigned to a different area to prevent workers from tapping the same trees successively.

The town had a strict set of rules imposed by the managers. Alcohol, women, tobacco and even football (American soccer) were forbidden within the town, including inside the workers' own homes. Inspectors (American managers) would go from house to house to check how organized the houses were and to enforce these rules. The inhabitants circumvented these prohibitions by paddling out to merchant riverboats moored beyond the town jurisdiction, often hiding contraband goods inside fruits like watermelons.

The land was hilly, rocky and infertile. None of Ford's managers had the requisite knowledge of tropical agriculture. In the wild, the rubber trees grow apart from each other as a protection mechanism against plagues and diseases, often growing close to bigger trees of other species for added support. In Fordlândia, however, the trees were planted close together in plantations, easy prey for tree blight, Saúva ants, lace bugs, red spiders, and leaf caterpillars.

Greg Grandin, whose father was a construction engineer in Fordlândia, enjoyed spending time with his father while he worked in Brazil. Within Grandin's book, The Rise and Fall of Henry Ford's Forgotten Jungle City, he explains how "Ford had very particular understandings about what a proper diet should be … He tried to impose brown rice and whole-wheat bread and canned peaches and oatmeal — and that itself created discontent". The unfamiliar food, American-style housing, and other limitations were at minimum disliked. Additionally, workers felt the way they were treated inhumanly – being required work through the middle of the day under the tropical sun – often refusing to work or they would succumb to the heat and humidity of the Amazon Rainforest.

Revolts
In 1930, the native workers grew tired of Ford's imposed diet  in addition to a change with how the food was distributed and revolted in the town's cafeteria. This became known as the Breaking Pans (Portuguese: Quebra-Panelas). The rebels proceeded to cut the telegraph wires and chased away the managers and even the town's cook into the jungle for a few days until the Brazilian Army arrived and the revolt ended. Agreements were then made on the type of food the workers would be served.

Ford's Failure
A 2009 NPR article reported, "Not one drop of latex from Fordlândia ever made it into a Ford car". The government of Brazil was suspicious of any foreign investments, particularly in the northern Amazonian region, and offered little help. It wasn't long before the numerous problems began to take a toll on the project and the decision was made to relocate. By 1945, synthetic rubber had been developed, reducing world demand for natural rubber. Ford's investment opportunity dried up overnight without producing any rubber for Ford's tires, and the second town was also abandoned. In 1945, Henry Ford's grandson Henry Ford II sold the area comprising both towns back to the Brazilian government for a loss of over US$20 million (equivalent to $ million in ).

In spite of the huge investment and numerous invitations, Henry Ford never visited either of his ill-fated towns.

Ministry of Agriculture

Between the 1950s and late 1970s, after being given back the rights to the lands, the Brazilian government, through its Ministry of Agriculture, installed several facilities in the area. The houses that once belonged to Ford's rubber tappers were then given to the families of the Ministry's employees, whose descendants still occupy them.

This project was also short-lived and left the city nearly completely abandoned upon reaching its end.

Rebirth
The town remained inhabited by roughly 90 people until the latter half of the first decade of the twenty-first century. No basic services were offered in the area, with medical help only coming by boat at long intervals. That changed when people looking for places to live decided to go back into the town, often claiming houses. The town, now a district of Aveiro, is home to nearly 3,000 people .

Facilities

Most of the original buildings still stand, with the exception of the hospital, which was dismantled by looters.

Water Tower
As with most of the equipment in the town, it was built in Michigan and brought to Fordlândia by merchant ship. The water tower, water treatment plant and all of its original plumbing are still operational.

Hospital

The hospital was left intact until the late 2000s, when looters completely dismantled the hospital and removed its contents.

Before being dismantled, a number of controversies occurred regarding the hospital's X-ray machines. As a local TV station reported, several marked boxes containing radioactive material were left behind. This generated fears of contamination among the population of nearby towns and cities, with people often mentioning the Goiânia accident, causing the authorities to remove the materials following an outcry.

Sawmill
The town had a sawmill responsible for providing lumber for all the construction around. The sawmill and kiln still stand; however, most equipment is gone.

Workshop
The town's workshop was a three-story warehouse responsible for manufacturing parts for the machines working in the town. It still stands and has most of the original equipment. It is now used as a warehouse where most artifacts from Ford's era are kept. Hospital beds, equipment, a lead coffin and parts of an X-ray machine are stored in this warehouse.

The second floor of the warehouse was allowed to be used for the processing of seeds for a community project. The oil extracted from those seeds greatly accelerated the rotting of the wooden floor which has collapsed in some areas.

American Village
The six houses in the American Village still had their original furniture, silverware and even clothes that were left behind when the town was deserted. The houses were claimed by locals and most items were sold or taken as souvenirs. One of the houses was lost to a fire.

Legacy and depictions
 The future London in Brave New World by Aldous Huxley is heavily inspired by the concept of Fordlândia.
 The 6th installment of the Franco-Belgian comic series Marsupilami by Yann and Batem, published in 1991, is titled "Fordlandia" and takes place there.
 Singer/songwriter Kate Campbell has a track entitled "Fordlândia" on her 2008 album Save the Day.
 Argentinian writer Eduardo Sguiglia wrote a novel entitled Fordlandia.
 In November 2008, Icelandic composer Jóhann Jóhannsson released an album entitled Fordlandia.
 In 2009, Greg Grandin published his non-fiction account Fordlandia: The Rise and Fall of Henry Ford's Forgotten Jungle City, and Montreal artist Scott Chandler photographed Fordlândia.
 German television production company Gebrüder Beetz included Fordlândia in episode 4 of their 5-part series Modern Ruins.
 British artist Dan Dubowitz photographed Fordlândia in 2012.
 British actor and comedian Michael Palin's 4-part TV travel documentary Brazil with Michael Palin featured Fordlândia in episode 2 shown on BBC1 on 31 October 2012.
 In the PC game The Amazon Trail, the player travels back in time to meet Henry Ford there.
 American author Buell Hollister explores Fordlândia's history and uses the area as the setting in his 2015 novel Leeram in Fordlandia.

Notes and references

Bibliography
  Michel Braudeau, « Henry Ford vaincu par la « rouille » », in Le rêve amazonien, éditions Gallimard, 2004.
 Colón, Marcos. Slow Seeing and the Environment: Connections and Meanings in Beyond Fordlândia, In Sustentability in Debate, edited by Gabriela Litre, Marcel Bursztyn and Carlos Hiroo Saito. Brasília, v. 9, n.1, (April/2018) 136-144.
Colón, Marcos. Beyond Fordlândia: An Environmental Account of Henry Ford's Adventures in the Amazon. Amazônia Latitude Films (2018). https://beyondfordlandia.com
Grandin, Greg, Fordlandia: The Rise and Fall of Henry Ford's Forgotten Jungle City, Metropolitan Books, 2009. ;

See also
Planned communities

External links

The Ruins of Fordlândia, by Alan Bellows, from Damn Interesting, posted 3 August 2006. Includes pictures.
Fordlandia: The Rise and Fall of Henry Ford’s Forgotten Jungle City - Democracy Now, broadcast 2 July 2009, Video and Discussion (transcript available).
Fordlandia on Flickr - Historic images from the Benson Ford Research Center, a library and archive located at the Henry Ford Museum.
 "Deep in Brazil’s Amazon, Exploring the Ruins of Ford’s Fantasyland," by SIMON ROMERO, The New York Times, Feb. 20, 2017
 Fordlandia - 99% Invisible podcast episode 298, posted 6 March 2018

Geography of Pará
Ford Motor Company
Rubber industry
Planned industrial developments
Buildings and structures in Pará
Districts of Brazil
Populated places established in 1928
Populated places in Pará